Passiflora manicata is a species of Passiflora from Colombia and Ecuador.

References

External links
 
 

manicata
Flora of Ecuador